Francileudo Silva dos Santos Lima (born 20 March 1979) is a retired professional footballer who played as a forward.

In club football, he had his greatest successes at Sochaux, helping them win Ligue 2 in 2001 as top scorer and player of the season; they later won the Coupe de la Ligue in 2004. He also represented Toulouse in Ligue 1, and while on loan at FC Zürich, he won the Swiss Super League in 2007.

Born in Brazil, he became a naturalised Tunisian before their hosting of the 2004 Africa Cup of Nations, and was joint top scorer as they won it. He also played at two more such tournaments, and the 2006 FIFA World Cup.

Club career
Born in Zé Doca, Maranhão, Brazil, Santos began his professional career with Standard Liège in Belgium, before spending two years with Étoile Sportive du Sahel in Tunisia. He then moved to FC Sochaux-Montbéliard in France in 2000, and was top scorer with 21 goals and player of the season as they won Ligue 2 in his first season. He played as they won the 2004 Coupe de la Ligue Final; in the last 32 he scored in a 3–2 extra-time home win over ASOA Valence. In February 2004, he was removed from the squad to avoid a doping ban due to his corticoid use, as the club awaited a facsimile of his prescription from Tunisia.

After nine goals in his final Ligue 1 season, Santos turned down a new two-year contract to sign for fellow league team Toulouse FC on a three-year deal in May 2005. Having played only four times under manager Élie Baup in his second season, he was loaned to FC Zürich of the Swiss Super League in February 2007 for the rest of the season. In May, he opened a 2–0 win against city rivals Grasshopper Club Zürich to take the title.

On 1 July 2008, Santos returned to Sochaux on a one-year deal. He then had a season at FC Istres before going back to Étoile Sportive.

Santos returned to Franche-Comté in September 2013, to sign for ASM Belfort of the fourth-tier CFA. In June 2015, he signed for a year at Swiss amateurs FC Porrentruy.

International career
Santos was naturalised as a Tunisian citizen in December 2003, days before the country was due to host the 2004 Africa Cup of Nations. He debuted for the Carthage Eagles on 17 January in a 2–1 friendly win over Benin in Sfax, in which he scored after eight minutes. In the first two group games, he scored a goal in a 2–1 win against Rwanda and two in a 3–0 victory against DR Congo. He opened the scoring after five minutes in the final, a 2–1 win over rivals Morocco at the Stade 7 Novembre. With four goals, he was one of five joint top scorers.

In June 2004, Santos apologised for having draped himself in the Brazilian flag when celebrating Sochaux's Coupe de la Ligue win. He was Tunisia's top scorer with five goals in qualification for the 2006 FIFA World Cup; this included four on 26 March 2005 as they beat Malawi 7–0 at home. He was also part of the squad that were eliminated from the group stage at the 2005 FIFA Confederations Cup in Germany, where he scored both goals of a win over Australia in their last game.

At the 2006 Africa Cup of Nations in Egypt, Tunisia reached the quarter-finals. Santos scored a hat-trick in a 4–1 win over Zambia in the first game and another in a 2–0 victory against South Africa in the next. Manager Roger Lemerre called him up for the 2006 FIFA World Cup, where he only played the last ten minutes of a group stage elimination by Ukraine at the Berlin Olympiastadion, as a substitute for Adel Chedli.

Santos also went to the 2008 Africa Cup of Nations in Ghana, another quarter-final finish. He scored twice in a 3–1 win over South Africa in the second group game.

Career statistics

International

International goals
Scores and results list Tunisia's goal tally first, score column indicates score after each santos goal.

Honours
Sochaux
Ligue 2: 2000–01
Coupe de la Ligue: 2003–04

FC Zürich
Swiss Super League: 2006–07

Tunisia
Africa Cup of Nations: 2004

Individual
Ligue 2 top scorer: 2000–01
Ligue 2 player of the year: 2000–01
Africa Cup of Nations top scorer: 2004

References

External links
  
 
 

1979 births
Living people
Sportspeople from Maranhão
Brazilian footballers
Brazilian emigrants to Tunisia
Naturalized citizens of Tunisia
Tunisian people of Brazilian descent
Tunisian footballers
Association football forwards
Tunisia international footballers
2005 FIFA Confederations Cup players
2006 FIFA World Cup players
2004 African Cup of Nations players
2006 Africa Cup of Nations players
2008 Africa Cup of Nations players
Ligue 1 players
Ligue 2 players
Swiss Super League players
Belgian Pro League players
Tunisian Ligue Professionnelle 1 players
Standard Liège players
Étoile Sportive du Sahel players
FC Sochaux-Montbéliard players
Toulouse FC players
FC Zürich players
FC Istres players
ASM Belfort players
Tunisian expatriate footballers
Expatriate footballers in France
Expatriate footballers in Belgium
Expatriate footballers in Switzerland